Graham Kennedy (1934–2005) was an Australian entertainer, comedian and variety performer.

Graham Kennedy may also refer to:

 Graham Kennedy (rugby league) (1939–2002), New Zealand rugby league footballer and coach
 Graham Kennedy (cricketer) (born 1999), Irish cricketer